The 66th United States Congress was a meeting of the legislative branch of the United States federal government, comprising the United States Senate and the United States House of Representatives. It met in Washington, D.C., from March 4, 1919, to March 4, 1921, during the last two years of Woodrow Wilson's presidency. The apportionment of seats in the House of Representatives was based on the 1910 United States census.

The Republicans won majorities in both the House and the Senate, thus taking control of both chambers.

This is the last congress to have no female members of congress in the House of Representatives, and thus the last time there was an all-male congress (several subsequent congresses, up to the 96th Congress, would have periods with no women in the Senate but several in the House).

Major legislation
 June 30, 1919: Navy Appropriations Act of 1919
 June 30, 1919: Hastings Amendment
 July 11, 1919: Anti-Lobbying Act of 1919
 July 11, 1919: Army Appropriations Act of 1919
 July 19, 1919: Sundry Civil Expenses Appropriations Act
 October 18, 1919: National Prohibition Act (Volstead Act), ch. 85, 
 October 22, 1919: Underground Water Act of 1919
 October 29, 1919: National Motor Vehicle Theft Act (Dyer Act)
 November 4, 1919: Deficiency Act of 1919
 November 6, 1919: Indian Soldier Act of 1919
 December 24, 1919: Edge Act of 1919
 February 25, 1920: Oil Leasing Act of 1920
 February 25, 1920: Mineral Leasing Act of 1920 (Smoot-Sinnot Act), ch. 85, 
 February 25, 1920: Pipeline Rights-of-Way Act
 February 25, 1920: Sale of Water For Miscellaneous Purposes Act
 February 28, 1920: Esch-Cummins Act, 
 March 9, 1920: Suits in Admiralty Act of 1920
 March 15, 1920: Military Surplus Act of 1920 (Kahn-Wadsworth Act)
 March 30, 1920: Death on the High Seas Act of 1920
 April 13, 1920: Phelan Act of 1920
 May 1, 1920: Fuller Act of 1920
 May 10, 1920: Deportation Act of 1920
 May 18, 1920: Kinkaid Act of 1920
 May 20, 1920: Sale of Surplus Improved Public Lands Act
 May 22, 1920: Civil Service Retirement Act of 1920
 May 29, 1920: Independent Treasury Act of 1920
 June 2, 1920: Industry Vocational Rehabilitation Act of 1920 (Smith-Bankhead Act)
 June 2, 1920: Civilian Vocational Rehabilitation Act of 1920 (Smith-Fess Act)
 June 2, 1920: National Park Criminal Jurisdiction Act
 June 4, 1920: National Defense Act of 1920 (Kahn Act)
 June 5, 1920: Sills Act of 1920
 June 5, 1920: Merchant Marine Act of 1920 (Jones Act)
 June 5, 1920: Women's Bureau Act of 1920
 June 5, 1920: Ship Mortgage Act of 1920
 June 5, 1920: River and Harbors Act of 1920
 June 5, 1920: Federal Water Power Act of 1920 (Esch Act)
 January 4, 1921: War Finance Corporation Act of 1921
 March 3, 1921: Patent Act of 1921 (Nolan Act)
 March 3, 1921: Federal Water Power Act Amendment (Jones-Esch Act)

Major events

A brief special session was called by President Wilson in March 1919, because of a filibuster that had successfully blocked appropriations bills needed to fund day-to-day government operations.

 April 30, 1919: First wave of the 1919 United States anarchist bombings.
 June 2, 1919: The home of Attorney General Palmer was bombed in the second wave of anarchist bombings.
 June 15, 1919: Pancho Villa attacked Ciudad Juárez. When the bullets begin to fly to the U.S. side of the border, 2 units of the U.S. 7th Cavalry Regiment crossed the border and repulse Villa's forces.
 July 19–23, 1919: Race riot in Washington, D.C.
 August 31, 1919: American Communist Party was established
 September 9, 1919: Boston Police Strike
 September 22, 1919: Steel strike of 1919
 October 2, 1919: President Woodrow Wilson suffered a massive stroke, leaving him partially paralyzed
 November 1, 1919: Coal Strike of 1919
 November 7, 1919: First of the Palmer Raids during the First Red Scare
 January 2, 1920: Second of the Palmer Raids during the First Red Scare
 January 16, 1920: Prohibition, went into effect in the United States
 March 1, 1920: United States Railroad Administration returned control of American railroads to its constituent railroad companies
 May 7–8, 1920: Louis Freeland Post appeared before the House Committee on Rules, effectively ending Attorney General Palmer's presidential aspirations.
 November 2, 1920: Warren G. Harding defeated James M. Cox in the U.S. presidential election, 1920

Constitutional amendments 
 January 16, 1919: Eighteenth Amendment to the United States Constitution, declaring the production, transport, and sale of alcohol (though not the consumption or private possession) illegal, was ratified by the requisite number of states (then 36) to become part of the Constitution
Amendment later repealed on December 5, 1933, by the Twenty-first Amendment to the United States Constitution
 June 4, 1919: Approved an amendment to the U.S. Constitution prohibiting the states and the federal government from denying the right to vote to citizens of the United States on the basis of sex, and submitted it to the state legislatures for ratification 
 August 18, 1920: The Nineteenth Amendment to the United States Constitution was ratified by the requisite number of states (then 36) to become part of the Constitution

Treaties 
 March 19, 1920: Senate refused to ratify Treaty of Versailles

Party summary

Senate

House of Representatives

Leadership

Senate leadership

Presiding
 President: Thomas R. Marshall (D)
 President pro tempore: Albert B. Cummins (R)

Majority (Republican) leadership
Majority Leader: Henry Cabot Lodge
Majority Whip: Charles Curtis
 Republican Conference Secretary: James Wolcott Wadsworth Jr.
 National Senatorial Committee Chair: Miles Poindexter

Minority (Democratic) leadership
Minority Leader: Oscar Underwood
Minority Whip: Peter G. Gerry
 Democratic Caucus Secretary: William H. King

House leadership

Presiding
 Speaker: Frederick H. Gillett (R)

Majority (Republican) leadership
Majority Leader: Franklin Mondell
Majority Whip: Harold Knutson
 Republican Conference Chairman: Horace Mann Towner
 Republican Campaign Committee Chairman: Simeon D. Fess

Minority (Democratic) leadership
Minority Leader: Champ Clark
Minority Whip: vacant
 Democratic Caucus Chairman: Arthur Granville Dewalt
 Democratic Campaign Committee Chairman: Scott Ferris

Members
Skip to House of Representatives, below

Senate
In this Congress, Class 3 meant their term ended with this Congress, requiring reelection in 1920; Class 1 meant their term began in the last Congress, requiring reelection in 1922; and Class 2 meant their term began in this Congress, requiring reelection in 1924.

Alabama 
 2. John H. Bankhead (D), until March 1, 1920
 Braxton B. Comer (D), from March 5, 1920 - November 2, 1920
 J. Thomas Heflin (D), from November 3, 1920 
 3. Oscar W. Underwood (D)

Arizona 
 1. Henry F. Ashurst (D)
 3. Marcus A. Smith (D)

Arkansas 
 2. Joseph T. Robinson (D)
 3. William F. Kirby (D)

California 
 1. Hiram W. Johnson (R)
 3. James D. Phelan (D)

Colorado 
 2. Lawrence C. Phipps (R)
 3. Charles S. Thomas (D)

Connecticut 
 1. George P. McLean (R)
 3. Frank B. Brandegee (R)

Delaware 
 1. Josiah O. Wolcott (D)
 2. L. Heisler Ball (R)

Florida 
 1. Park Trammell (D)
 3. Duncan U. Fletcher (D)

Georgia 
 2. William J. Harris (D)
 3. Hoke Smith (D)

Idaho 
 2. William E. Borah (R)
 3. John F. Nugent (D), until January 14, 1921
 Frank R. Gooding (R), from January 15, 1921

Illinois 
 2. Joseph M. McCormick (R)
 3. Lawrence Y. Sherman (R)

Indiana 
 1. Harry S. New (R)
 3. James E. Watson (R)

Iowa 
 2. William S. Kenyon (R)
 3. Albert B. Cummins (R)

Kansas 
 2. Arthur Capper (R)
 3. Charles Curtis (R)

Kentucky 
 2. Augustus O. Stanley (D)
 3. John C. W. Beckham (D)

Louisiana 
 2. Joseph E. Ransdell (D)
 3. Edward J. Gay (D)

Maine 
 1. Frederick Hale (R)
 2. Bert M. Fernald (R)

Maryland 
 1. Joseph I. France (R)
 3. John Walter Smith (D)

Massachusetts 
 1. Henry Cabot Lodge (R)
 2. David I. Walsh (D)

Michigan 
 1. Charles E. Townsend (R)
 2. Truman H. Newberry (R)

Minnesota 
 1. Frank B. Kellogg (R)
 2. Knute Nelson (R)

Mississippi 
 1. John Sharp Williams (D)
 2. Pat Harrison (D)

Missouri 
 1. James A. Reed (D)
 3. Selden P. Spencer (R)

Montana 
 1. Henry L. Myers (D)
 2. Thomas J. Walsh (D)

Nebraska 
 1. Gilbert M. Hitchcock (D)
 2. George W. Norris (R)

Nevada 
 1. Key Pittman (D)
 3. Charles B. Henderson (D)

New Hampshire 
 2. Henry W. Keyes (R)
 3. George H. Moses (R)

New Jersey 
 1. Joseph S. Frelinghuysen (R)
 2. Walter E. Edge (R)

New Mexico 
 1. Andrieus A. Jones (D)
 2. Albert B. Fall (R)

New York 
 1. William M. Calder (R)
 3. James W. Wadsworth Jr. (R)

North Carolina 
 2. Furnifold M. Simmons (D)
 3. Lee S. Overman (D)

North Dakota 
 1. Porter J. McCumber (R)
 3. Asle J. Gronna (R)

Ohio 
 1. Atlee Pomerene (D)
 3. Warren G. Harding (R), until January 13, 1921
 Frank B. Willis (R), from January 14, 1921

Oklahoma 
 2. Robert L. Owen (D)
 3. Thomas P. Gore (D)

Oregon 
 2. Charles L. McNary (R)
 3. George E. Chamberlain (D)

Pennsylvania 
 1. Philander C. Knox (R)
 3. Boies Penrose (R)

Rhode Island 
 1. Peter G. Gerry (D)
 2. LeBaron B. Colt (R)

South Carolina 
 2. Nathaniel B. Dial (D)
 3. Ellison D. Smith (D)

South Dakota 
 2. Thomas Sterling (R)
 3. Edwin S. Johnson (D)

Tennessee 
 1. Kenneth D. McKellar (D)
 2. John K. Shields (D)

Texas 
 1. Charles A. Culberson (D)
 2. Morris Sheppard (D)

Utah 
 1. William H. King (D)
 3. Reed Smoot (R)

Vermont 
 1. Carroll S. Page (R)
 3. William P. Dillingham (R),

Virginia 
 1. Claude A. Swanson (D)
 2. Thomas S. Martin (D), until November 12, 1919
 Carter Glass (D), from February 2, 1920

Washington 
 1. Miles Poindexter (R)
 3. Wesley L. Jones (R)

West Virginia 
 1. Howard Sutherland (R)
 2. Davis Elkins (R)

Wisconsin 
 1. Robert M. La Follette Sr. (R)
 3. Irvine L. Lenroot (R)

Wyoming 
 1. John B. Kendrick (D)
 2. Francis E. Warren (R)

House of Representatives
The names of members of the House of Representatives are preceded by their district numbers.

Alabama 
 . John McDuffie (D)
 . S. Hubert Dent Jr. (D)
 . Henry B. Steagall (D)
 . Fred L. Blackmon (D), until February 8, 1921
 . J. Thomas Heflin (D), until November 1, 1920
 William B. Bowling (D), from December 14, 1920
 . William B. Oliver (D)
 . John L. Burnett (D), until May 13, 1919
 Lilius Bratton Rainey (D), from September 30, 1919
 . Edward B. Almon (D)
 . George Huddleston (D)
 . William B. Bankhead (D)

Arizona 
 . Carl Hayden (D)

Arkansas 
 . Thaddeus H. Caraway (D)
 . William A. Oldfield (D)
 . John N. Tillman (D)
 . Otis Wingo (D)
 . Henderson M. Jacoway (D)
 . Samuel M. Taylor (D)
 . William S. Goodwin (D)

California 
 . Clarence F. Lea (D)
 . John E. Raker (D)
 . Charles F. Curry (R)
 . Julius Kahn (R)
 . John I. Nolan (R)
 . John A. Elston (R)
 . Henry E. Barbour (R)
 . Hugh S. Hersman (D)
 . Charles H. Randall (Proh.)
 . Henry Z. Osborne (R)
 . William Kettner (D)

Colorado 
 . William Newell Vaile (R)
 . Charles Bateman Timberlake (R)
 . Guy Urban Hardy (R)
 . Edward Thomas Taylor (D)

Connecticut 
 . Augustine Lonergan (D)
 . Richard P. Freeman (R)
 . John Q. Tilson (R)
 . Schuyler Merritt (R)
 . James P. Glynn (R)

Delaware 
 . Caleb R. Layton (R)

Florida 
 . Herbert J. Drane (D)
 . Frank Clark (D)
 . John H. Smithwick (D)
 . William J. Sears (D)

Georgia 
 . James W. Overstreet (D)
 . Frank Park (D)
 . Charles R. Crisp (D)
 . William C. Wright (D)
 . William D. Upshaw (D)
 . James W. Wise (D)
 . Gordon Lee (D)
 . Charles H. Brand (D)
 . Thomas Montgomery Bell (D)
 . Carl Vinson (D)
 . William C. Lankford (D)
 . William W. Larsen (D)

Idaho 
 . Burton L. French (R)
 . Addison T. Smith (R)

Illinois 
 . Richard Yates (R)
 . William E. Mason (R)
 . Martin B. Madden (R)
 . James R. Mann (R)
 . William W. Wilson (R)
 . John W. Rainey (D)
 . Adolph J. Sabath (D)
 . James McAndrews (D)
 . Niels Juul (R)
 . Thomas Gallagher (D)
 . Frederick A. Britten (R)
 . Carl R. Chindblom (R)
 . Ira C. Copley (R)
 . Charles Eugene Fuller (R)
 . John C. McKenzie (R)
 . William J. Graham (R)
 . Edward John King (R)
 . Clifford Ireland (R)
 . Frank L. Smith (R)
 . Joseph G. Cannon (R)
 . William B. McKinley (R)
 . Henry T. Rainey (D)
 . Loren E. Wheeler (R)
 . William A. Rodenberg (R)
 . Edwin B. Brooks (R)
 . Thomas S. Williams (R)
 . Edward E. Denison (R)

Indiana 
 . Oscar R. Luhring (R)
 . Oscar E. Bland (R)
 . James W. Dunbar (R)
 . John S. Benham (R)
 . Everett Sanders (R)
 . Richard N. Elliott (R)
 . Merrill Moores (R)
 . Albert H. Vestal (R)
 . Fred S. Purnell (R)
 . William R. Wood (R)
 . Milton Kraus (R)
 . Louis W. Fairfield (R)
 . Andrew J. Hickey (R)

Iowa 
 . Charles A. Kennedy (R)
 . Harry E. Hull (R)
 . Burton E. Sweet (R)
 . Gilbert N. Haugen (R)
 . James W. Good (R)
 . C. William Ramseyer (R)
 . Cassius C. Dowell (R)
 . Horace M. Towner (R)
 . William R. Green (R)
 . L. J. Dickinson (R)
 . William D. Boies (R)

Kansas 
 . Daniel Read Anthony Jr. (R)
 . Edward C. Little (R)
 . Philip P. Campbell (R)
 . Homer Hoch (R)
 . James G. Strong (R)
 . Hays B. White (R)
 . Jasper Napoleon Tincher (R)
 . William A. Ayres (D)

Kentucky 
 . Alben Barkley (D)
 . David Hayes Kincheloe (D)
 . Robert Y. Thomas Jr. (D)
 . Ben Johnson (D)
 . Charles F. Ogden (R)
 . Arthur B. Rouse (D)
 . J. Campbell Cantrill (D)
 . King Swope (R), from August 1, 1919
 . William Jason Fields (D)
 . John W. Langley (R)
 . John M. Robsion (R)

Louisiana 
 . Albert Estopinal (D), until April 28, 1919
 James O'Connor (D), from June 5, 1919
 . Henry Garland Dupré (D)
 . Whitmell P. Martin (D)
 . John Thomas Watkins (D)
 . Riley Joseph Wilson (D)
 . Jared Y. Sanders Sr. (D)
 . Ladislas Lazaro (D)
 . James Benjamin Aswell (D)

Maine 
 . Louis B. Goodall (R)
 . Wallace H. White Jr. (R)
 . John A. Peters (R)
 . Ira G. Hersey (R)

Maryland 
 . William N. Andrews (R)
 . Carville D. Benson (D)
 . Charles P. Coady (D)
 . J. Charles Linthicum (D)
 . Sydney Emanuel Mudd II (R)
 . Frederick N. Zihlman (R)

Massachusetts 
 . Allen T. Treadway (R)
 . Frederick H. Gillett (R)
 . Calvin D. Paige (R)
 . Samuel E. Winslow (R)
 . John J. Rogers (R)
 . Willfred W. Lufkin (R)
 . Michael F. Phelan (D)
 . Frederick W. Dallinger (R)
 . Alvan T. Fuller (R), until January 5, 1921
 . John F. Fitzgerald (D), until October 23, 1919
 Peter Francis Tague (D), from October 23, 1919
 . George H. Tinkham (R)
 . James A. Gallivan (D)
 . Robert Luce (R)
 . Richard Olney II (D)
 . William S. Greene (R)
 . Joseph Walsh (R)

Michigan 
 . Frank E. Doremus (D)
 . Earl C. Michener (R)
 . John M. C. Smith (R)
 . Edward L. Hamilton (R)
 . Carl Mapes (R)
 . Patrick H. Kelley (R)
 . Louis C. Cramton (R)
 . Joseph W. Fordney (R)
 . James C. McLaughlin (R)
 . Gilbert A. Currie (R)
 . Frank D. Scott (R)
 . W. Frank James (R)
 . Charles Archibald Nichols (R), until April 25, 1920
 Clarence J. McLeod (R), from November 2, 1920

Minnesota 
 . Sydney Anderson (R)
 . Franklin Ellsworth (R)
 . Charles Russell Davis (R)
 . Carl Van Dyke (D), until May 20, 1919
 Oscar Keller (R), from July 1, 1919
 . Walter Newton (R)
 . Harold Knutson (R)
 . Andrew Volstead (R)
 . William Leighton Carss (FL)
 . Halvor Steenerson (R)
 . Thomas D. Schall (R)

Mississippi 
 . Ezekiel S. Candler Jr. (D)
 . Hubert D. Stephens (D)
 . Benjamin G. Humphreys II (D)
 . Thomas U. Sisson (D)
 . William Webb Venable (D)
 . Paul B. Johnson Sr. (D)
 . Percy E. Quin (D)
 . James W. Collier (D)

Missouri 
 . Milton A. Romjue (D)
 . William W. Rucker (D)
 . Joshua W. Alexander (D), until December 15, 1919
 Jacob L. Milligan (D), from February 14, 1920
 . Charles F. Booher (D), until January 21, 1921
 . William Thomas Bland (D)
 . Clement C. Dickinson (D)
 . Samuel C. Major (D)
 . William L. Nelson (D)
 . Champ Clark (D), until March 2, 1921
 . Cleveland A. Newton (R)
 . William Leo Igoe (D)
 . Leonidas C. Dyer (R)
 . Marion E. Rhodes (R)
 . Edward D. Hays (R)
 . Isaac V. McPherson (R)
 . Thomas L. Rubey (D)

Montana 
 . John M. Evans (D)
 . Carl W. Riddick (R)

Nebraska 
 . C. Frank Reavis (R)
 . Albert W. Jefferis (R)
 . Robert E. Evans (R)
 . Melvin O. McLaughlin (R)
 . William E. Andrews (R)
 . Moses P. Kinkaid (R)

Nevada 
 . Charles R. Evans (D)

New Hampshire 
 . Sherman Everett Burroughs (R)
 . Edward Hills Wason (R)

New Jersey 
 . William J. Browning (R), until March 24, 1920
 Francis F. Patterson Jr. (R), from November 2, 1920
 . Isaac Bacharach (R)
 . Thomas J. Scully (D)
 . Elijah C. Hutchinson (R)
 . Ernest R. Ackerman (R)
 . John R. Ramsey (R)
 . Amos H. Radcliffe (R)
 . Cornelius A. McGlennon (D)
 . Daniel F. Minahan (D)
 . Frederick R. Lehlbach (R)
 . John J. Eagan (D)
 . James A. Hamill (D)

New Mexico 
 . Benigno C. Hernández (R)

New York 
 . Frederick C. Hicks (R)
 . C. Pope Caldwell (D)
 . John MacCrate (R), until December 30, 1920
 . Thomas H. Cullen (D)
 . John B. Johnston (D)
 . Frederick W. Rowe (R)
 . James P. Maher (D)
 . William E. Cleary (D)
 . David J. O'Connell (D)
 . Reuben L. Haskell (R), until December 31, 1919
 Lester D. Volk (R), from November 2, 1920
 . Daniel J. Riordan (D)
 . Henry M. Goldfogle (D)
 . Christopher D. Sullivan (D)
 . Fiorello H. LaGuardia (R), until December 31, 1919
 Nathan David Perlman (R), from November 2, 1920
 . Peter J. Dooling (D)
 . Thomas F. Smith (D)
 . Herbert C. Pell Jr. (D)
 . John F. Carew (D)
 . Joseph Rowan (D)
 . Isaac Siegel (R)
 . Jerome F. Donovan (D)
 . Anthony J. Griffin (D)
 . Richard F. McKiniry (D)
 . James V. Ganly (D)
 . James W. Husted (R)
 . Edmund Platt (R), until June 7, 1920
 Hamilton Fish III (R), from November 2, 1920
 . Charles B. Ward (R)
 . Rollin B. Sanford (R)
 . James S. Parker (R)
 . Frank Crowther (R)
 . Bertrand H. Snell (R)
 . Luther W. Mott (R)
 . Homer P. Snyder (R)
 . William H. Hill (R)
 . Walter W. Magee (R)
 . Norman J. Gould (R)
 . Alanson B. Houghton (R)
 . Thomas B. Dunn (R)
 . Archie D. Sanders (R)
 . S. Wallace Dempsey (R)
 . Clarence MacGregor (R)
 . James M. Mead (D)
 . Daniel A. Reed (R)

North Carolina 
 . John Humphrey Small (D)
 . Claude Kitchin (D)
 . Samuel M. Brinson (D)
 . Edward W. Pou (D)
 . Charles M. Stedman (D)
 . Hannibal L. Godwin (D)
 . Leonidas D. Robinson (D)
 . Robert L. Doughton (D)
 . Edwin Y. Webb (D), until November 10, 1919
 Clyde R. Hoey (D), from December 16, 1919
 . Zebulon Weaver (D)

North Dakota 
 . John Miller Baer (R)
 . George M. Young (R)
 . James H. Sinclair (R)

Ohio 
 . Nicholas Longworth (R)
 . Ambrose E.B. Stephens (R)
 . Warren Gard (D)
 . Benjamin F. Welty (D)
 . Charles J. Thompson (R)
 . Charles C. Kearns (R)
 . Simeon D. Fess (R)
 . R. Clint Cole (R)
 . Isaac R. Sherwood (D)
 . Israel M. Foster (R)
 . Edwin D. Ricketts (R)
 . Clement L. Brumbaugh (D)
 . James T. Begg (R)
 . Martin L. Davey (D)
 . C. Ellis Moore (R)
 . Roscoe C. McCulloch (R)
 . William A. Ashbrook (D)
 . B. Frank Murphy (R)
 . John G. Cooper (R)
 . Charles A. Mooney (D)
 . John J. Babka (D)
 . Henry I. Emerson (R)

Oklahoma 
 . Everette B. Howard (D)
 . William W. Hastings (D)
 . Charles D. Carter (D)
 . Tom D. McKeown (D)
 . Joseph Bryan Thompson (D), until September 18, 1919
 John W. Harreld (R), from November 8, 1919
 . Scott Ferris (D)
 . James V. McClintic (D)
 . Dick Thompson Morgan (R), until July 4, 1920
 Charles Swindall (R), from November 2, 1920

Oregon 
 . Willis C. Hawley (R)
 . Nicholas J. Sinnott (R)
 . Clifton N. McArthur (R)

Pennsylvania 
 . Thomas S. Crago (R)
 . William J. Burke (R)
 . Anderson H. Walters (R)
 . Mahlon M. Garland (R), until November 19, 1920
 . William S. Vare (R)
 . George S. Graham (R)
 . J. Hampton Moore (R), until January 4, 1920
 Harry C. Ransley (R), from November 2, 1920
 . George W. Edmonds (R)
 . Peter E. Costello (R)
 . George P. Darrow (R)
 . Thomas S. Butler (R)
 . Henry Winfield Watson (R)
 . William W. Griest (R)
 . Patrick McLane (D), until February 25, 1921
 John R. Farr (R), from February 25, 1921
 . John J. Casey (D)
 . John Reber (R)
 . Arthur G. Dewalt (D)
 . Louis T. McFadden (R)
 . Edgar R. Kiess (R)
 . John V. Lesher (D)
 . Benjamin K. Focht (R)
 . Aaron S. Kreider (R)
 . John M. Rose (R)
 . Edward S. Brooks (R)
 . Evan J. Jones (R)
 . John Haden Wilson (D)
 . Samuel A. Kendall (R)
 . Henry W. Temple (R)
 . Milton W. Shreve (R)
 . Henry J. Steele (D)
 . Nathan L. Strong (R)
 . Willis J. Hulings (R)
 . Stephen G. Porter (R)
 . M. Clyde Kelly (R)
 . John M. Morin (R)
 . Guy E. Campbell (D)

Rhode Island 
 . Clark Burdick (R)
 . Walter Russell Stiness (R)
 . Ambrose Kennedy (R)

South Carolina 
 . Richard S. Whaley (D)
 . James F. Byrnes (D)
 . Fred H. Dominick (D)
 . Samuel J. Nicholls (D)
 . William F. Stevenson (D)
 . J. Willard Ragsdale (D), until July 23, 1919
 Philip H. Stoll (D), from October 7, 1919
 . Asbury Francis Lever (D), until August 1, 1919
 Edward C. Mann (D), from October 7, 1919

South Dakota 
 . Charles A. Christopherson (R)
 . Royal C. Johnson (R)
 . Harry L. Gandy (D)

Tennessee 
 . Sam R. Sells (R)
 . J. Will Taylor (R)
 . John Austin Moon (D)
 . Cordell Hull (D)
 . Ewin L. Davis (D)
 . Joseph W. Byrns (D)
 . Lemuel Phillips Padgett (D)
 . Thetus Willrette Sims (D)
 . Finis J. Garrett (D)
 . Hubert Fisher (D)

Texas 
 . Eugene Black (D)
 . John C. Box (D)
 . James Young (D)
 . Sam Rayburn (D)
 . Hatton W. Sumners (D)
 . Rufus Hardy (D)
 . Clay Stone Briggs (D)
 . Joe H. Eagle (D)
 . Joseph J. Mansfield (D)
 . James P. Buchanan (D)
 . Tom T. Connally (D)
 . Fritz G. Lanham (D), from April 19, 1919
 . Lucian W. Parrish (D)
 . Carlos Bee (D)
 . John Nance Garner (D)
 . Claude Benton Hudspeth (D)
 . Thomas L. Blanton (D)
 . John Marvin Jones (D)

Utah 
 . Milton H. Welling (D)
 . James Henry Mays (D)

Vermont 
 . Frank L. Greene (R)
 . Porter H. Dale (R)

Virginia 
 . S. Otis Bland (D)
 . Edward Everett Holland (D)
 . Andrew Jackson Montague (D)
 . Walter Allen Watson (D), until December 24, 1919
 Patrick H. Drewry (D), from April 27, 1920
 . Edward W. Saunders (D), until February 29, 1920
 Rorer A. James (D), from June 1, 1920
 . James P. Woods (D)
 . Thomas W. Harrison (D)
 . R. Walton Moore (D), from April 27, 1919
 . C. Bascom Slemp (R)
 . Henry De Flood (D)

Washington 
 . John F. Miller (R)
 . Lindley H. Hadley (R)
 . Albert Johnson (R)
 . John W. Summers (R)
 . J. Stanley Webster (R)

West Virginia 
 . Matthew M. Neely (D)
 . George M. Bowers (R)
 . Stuart F. Reed (R)
 . Harry C. Woodyard (R)
 . Wells Goodykoontz (R)
 . Leonard S. Echols (R)

Wisconsin 
 . Clifford E. Randall (R)
 . Edward Voigt (R)
 . James G. Monahan (R)
 . John C. Kleczka (R)
 . Victor L. Berger (Soc.), until November 10, 1919
 . Florian Lampert (R)
 . John Jacob Esch (R)
 . Edward E. Browne (R)
 . David G. Classon (R)
 . James A. Frear (R)
 . Adolphus P. Nelson (R)

Wyoming 
 . Franklin Wheeler Mondell (R)

Non-voting members
 . Charles A. Sulzer (D), until April 28, 1919
 George B. Grigsby (D), from June 3, 1920 - March 1, 1921
 James Wickersham (R), from March 1, 1921
 . Jonah Kuhio Kalanianaole (R)
 . Félix Córdova Dávila (Resident Commissioner), Unionist
 . Jaime C. de Veyra (Resident Commissioner)
 . Teodoro R. Yangco (Resident Commissioner), (I) until March 3, 1920
 Isauro Gabaldon (Resident Commissioner), (Nac.) from March 4, 1920

Changes in membership
The count below reflects changes from the beginning of the first session of this Congress.

Senate
 Replacements: 5
 Democratic: 1 seat net loss
 Republican: 1 seat net gain
 Deaths: 2
 Resignations: 2
 Vacancy: 0
 Total seats with changes:  4

House of Representatives
 Replacements: 23
 Democratic: 4 seat net loss
 Republican: 4 seat net gain
 Deaths: 13
 Resignations: 10
 Contested elections: 3
 Total seats with changes: 32

Committees

Senate

 United States Senate Select Committee on the Additional Accommodations for the Library of Congress|Additional Accommodations for the Library of Congress (Select) (Chairman: Furnifold M. Simmons; Ranking Member: Boies Penrose)
 Agriculture and Forestry (Chairman: Asle Gronna; Ranking Member: Thomas P. Gore)
 Appropriations (Chairman: Francis E. Warren; Ranking Member: Lee S. Overman)
 Audit and Control the Contingent Expenses of the Senate (Chairman: William M. Calder; Ranking Member: Andrieus A. Jones)
 Banking and Currency (Chairman: George P. McLean; Ranking Member: Robert L. Owen)
 Budget (Special) 
 Canadian Relations (Chairman: Frederick Hale; Ranking Member: John B. Kendrick)
 Census (Chairman: Howard Sutherland; Ranking Member: Morris Sheppard)
 Civil Service and Retrenchment (Chairman: Thomas Sterling; Ranking Member: Kenneth McKellar)
 Claims (Chairman: Selden P. Spencer; Ranking Member: Joseph T. Robinson)
 Coast and Insular Survey (Chairman: Walter Evans Edge; Ranking Member: Edward J. Gay)
 Coast Defenses (Chairman: Joseph S. Frelinghuysen; Ranking Member: John W. Smith)
 Commerce (Chairman: Wesley L. Jones; Ranking Member: Duncan U. Fletcher)
 Conservation of National Resources (Chairman: Ellison D. Smith; Ranking Member: LeBaron B. Colt)
 Corporations Organized in the District of Columbia (Chairman: Atlee Pomerene; Ranking Member: Robert M. La Follette)
 Cuban Relations (Chairman: Hiram W. Johnson; Ranking Member: Oscar W. Underwood)
 Disposition of Useless Papers in the Executive Departments (Chairman: Thomas J. Walsh; Ranking Member: Joseph I. France)
 District of Columbia (Chairman: Lawrence Y. Sherman; Ranking Member: John W. Smith)
 District of Columbia Public School System (Select)
 Education and Labor (Chairman: William S. Kenyon; Ranking Member: Hoke Smith)
 Engrossed Bills (Chairman: Lee S. Overman; Ranking Member: Francis E. Warren)
 Enrolled Bills (Chairman: L. Heisler Ball; Ranking Member: Nathaniel B. Dial)
 Establish a University in the United States (Select)
 Examine the Several Branches in the Civil Service (Chairman: John Walter Smith; Ranking Member: Frank B. Brandegee)
 Expenditures in the Department of Agriculture (Chairman: Arthur Capper; Ranking Member: Furnifold M. Simmons)
 Expenditures in the Department of Commerce (Chairman: Davis Elkins; Ranking Member: Josiah O. Wolcott)
 Expenditures in the Interior Department  (Chairman: John H. Bankhead; Ranking Member: Reed Smoot)
 Expenditures in the Department of Justice (Chairman: Thomas P. Gore; Ranking Member: William E. Borah)
 Expenditures in the Department of Labor (Chairman: Medill McCormick; Ranking Member: J.C.W. Beckham)
 Expenditures in the Navy Department (Chairman: Claude A. Swanson; Ranking Member: William P. Dillingham)
 Expenditures in the Post Office Department (Chairman: Henry W. Keyes; Ranking Member: William H. King)
 Expenditures in the Department of State (Chairman: Lawrence C. Phipps; Ranking Member: Henry L. Myers)
 Expenditures in the Treasury Department (Chairman: Hoke Smith; Ranking Member: Warren G. Harding)
 Finance (Chairman: Boies Penrose; Ranking Member: Furnifold M. Simmons)
 Fisheries (Chairman: Truman H. Newberry; Ranking Member: Duncan U. Fletcher)
 Five Civilized Tribes of Indians (Chairman: Robert L. Owen; Ranking Member: George W. Norris)
 Foreign Relations (Chairman: Henry Cabot Lodge; Ranking Member: Gilbert M. Hitchcock)
 Forest Reservations and the Protection of Game (Chairman: Gilbert M. Hitchcock; Ranking Member: George P. McLean)
 Geological Survey (Chairman: Marcus A. Smith; Ranking Member: George W. Norris)
 Immigration (Chairman: LeBaron B. Colt; Ranking Member: Thomas P. Gore)
 Indian Affairs (Chairman: Charles Curtis; Ranking Member: Henry F. Ashurst)
 Indian Depredations (Chairman: Henry L. Myers; Ranking Member: Miles Poindexter)
 Industrial Expositions (Chairman: Key Pittman; Ranking Member: Asle Gronna)
 Interoceanic Canals (Chairman: William E. Borah; Ranking Member: Thomas J. Walsh) 
 Interstate Commerce (Chairman: Albert B. Cummins; Ranking Member: Ellison D. Smith)
 Investigate Trespassers upon Indian Lands (Chairman: Henry F. Ashurst; Ranking Member: Wesley L. Jones)
 Irrigation and Reclamation of Arid Lands (Chairman: Charles L. McNary; Ranking Member: James D. Phelan)
 Judiciary (Chairman: Knute Nelson; Ranking Member: Charles A. Culberson) 
 Library (Chairman: Frank B. Brandegee; Ranking Member: John S. Williams) 
 Manufactures (Chairman: Robert M. La Follette; Ranking Member: Ellison D. Smith) 
 Military Affairs (Chairman: James W. Wadsworth Jr.; Ranking Member: George E. Chamberlain) 
 Mines and Mining (Chairman: Miles Poindexter; Ranking Member: Charles B. Henderson) 
 Mississippi River and its Tributaries (Select) (Chairman: Joseph E. Ransdell; Ranking Member: Albert B. Cummins)
 National Banks (Chairman: Frank B. Kellogg; Ranking Member: Peter G. Gerry) 
 Naval Affairs (Chairman: Carroll S. Page; Ranking Member: Claude A. Swanson) 
 Pacific Islands, Puerto Rico and the Virgin Islands (Chairman: Albert B. Fall; Ranking Member: Morris Sheppard) 
 Pacific Railroads (Chairman: Charles S. Thomas; Ranking Member: Frank B. Brandegee) 
 Patents (Chairman: George W. Norris; Ranking Member: William F. Kirby) 
 Pensions (Chairman: Porter J. McCumber; Ranking Member: Thomas J. Walsh) 
 Philippines (Chairman: Warren G. Harding; Ranking Member: Duncan U. Fletcher) 
 Post Office and Post Roads (Chairman: Charles E. Townsend; Ranking Member: John H. Bankhead) 
 Printing (Chairman: George H. Moses; Ranking Member: Marcus A. Smith) 
 Private Land Claims (Chairman: Charles A. Culberson; Ranking Member: Knute Nelson) 
 Privileges and Elections (Chairman: William P. Dillingham; Ranking Member: Atlee Pomerene) 
 Public Buildings and Grounds (Chairman: Bert M. Fernald; Ranking Member: James A. Reed) 
 Public Health and National Quarantine (Chairman: Joseph I. France; Ranking Member: Joseph E. Ransdell) 
 Public Lands (Chairman: Reed Smoot; Ranking Member: Henry L. Myers) 
 Railroads (Chairman: Irvine L. Lenroot; Ranking Member: Peter G. Gerry) 
 Reconstruction and Production (Select)
 Revision of the Laws (Chairman: N/A; Ranking Member: N/A) 
 Revolutionary Claims (Chairman: Morris Sheppard; Ranking Member: Henry Cabot Lodge) 
 Rules (Chairman: Philander C. Knox; Ranking Member: Lee S. Overman) 
 Standards, Weights and Measures (Chairman: William S. Kenyon; Ranking Member: Warren G. Harding)
 Tariff Regulation (Select)
 Territories (Chairman: Harry S. New; Ranking Member: Key Pittman) 
 Transportation and Sale of Meat Products (Select) (Chairman: Duncan U. Fletcher; Ranking Member: Porter J. McCumber) 
 Transportation Routes to the Seaboard (Chairman: Duncan U. Fletcher; Ranking Member: William P. Dillingham) 
 Trespassers upon Indian Lands (Select) (Chairman: Henry F. Ashurst; Ranking Member: Wesley L. Jones)
 Whole
 Woman Suffrage (Chairman: James Eli Watson; Ranking Member: Andrieus A. Jones)

House of Representatives

 Accounts (Chairman: Clifford Ireland; Ranking Member: Frank Park) 
 Agriculture (Chairman: Gilbert N. Haugen; Ranking Member: Gordon Lee) 
 Alcoholic Liquor Traffic (Chairman: Addison T. Smith; Ranking Member: William D. Upshaw) 
 Appropriations (Chairman: James W. Good; Ranking Member: Joseph W. Byrns) 
 Banking and Currency (Chairman: Edmund Platt; Ranking Member: Michael F. Phelan)  
 Budget (Select) (Chairman: James W. Good; Ranking Member: Joseph W. Byrns) 
 Census (Chairman: Charles A. Nichols; Ranking Member: James B. Aswell) 
 Claims (Chairman: George W. Edmonds; Ranking Member: Henry B. Steagall) 
 Coinage, Weights and Measures (Chairman: Albert H. Vestal; Ranking Member: William A. Ashbrook) 
 Disposition of Executive Papers (Chairman: Merrill Moores) 
 District of Columbia (Chairman: Carl E. Mapes; Ranking Member: Ben Johnson) 
 Education (Chairman: Simeon D. Fess; Ranking Member: William J. Sears) 
 Election of the President, Vice President and Representatives in Congress (Chairman: Florian Lampert; Ranking Member: William W. Rucker) 
 Elections No.#1 (Chairman: Frederick W. Dallinger; Ranking Member: Joe H. Eagle) 
 Elections No.#2 (Chairman: Louis B. Goodall; Ranking Member: James W. Overstreet) 
 Elections No.#3 (Chairman: Cassius C. Dowell; Ranking Member: Joseph Rowan)  
 Enrolled Bills (Chairman: John R. Ramsey; Ranking Member: Ladislas Lazaro) 
 Expenditures in the Agriculture Department (Chairman: John M. Baer; Ranking Member: Robert L. Doughton) 
 Expenditures in the Commerce Department (Chairman: Thomas Sutler Williams; Ranking Member: Michael F. Phelan) 
 Expenditures in the Interior Department (Chairman: Aaron S. Kreider; Ranking Member: William F. Stevenson) 
 Expenditures in the Justice Department (Chairman: Wallace H. White Jr.; Ranking Member: James P. Buchanan) 
 Expenditures in the Labor Department (Chairman: Anderson H. Walters; Ranking Member: John J. Casey) 
 Expenditures in the Navy Department (Chairman: Leonard S. Echols; Ranking Member: Rufus Hardy) 
 Expenditures in the Post Office Department (Chairman: Frederick N. Zihlman; Ranking Member: Benjamin G. Humphreys) 
 Expenditures in the State Department (Chairman: Richard N. Elliott; Ranking Member: Clement Brumbaugh) 
 Expenditures in the Treasury Department (Chairman: Porter H. Dale; Ranking Member: Charles D. Carter) 
 Expenditures in the War Department (Chairman: William J. Graham; Ranking Member: Jerome F. Donovan) 
 Expenditures on Public Buildings (Chairman: Ira G. Hersey; Ranking Member: Ezekiel S. Candler Jr.) 
 Flood Control (Chairman: William A. Rodenberg; Ranking Member: Benjamin G. Humphreys) 
 Foreign Affairs (Chairman: Stephen G. Porter; Ranking Member: Henry D. Flood) 
 Immigration and Naturalization (Chairman: Albert Johnson; Ranking Member: Adolph J. Sabath) 
 Indian Affairs (Chairman: Philip P. Campbell; Ranking Member: Charles D. Carter) 
 Industrial Arts and Expositions (Chairman: Oscar E. Bland; Ranking Member: Isaac R. Sherwood) 
 Insular Affairs (Chairman: Horace M. Towner; Ranking Member: Finis J. Garrett) 
 Interstate and Foreign Commerce (Chairman: John J. Esch; Ranking Member: Thetus W. Sims) 
 Invalid Pensions (Chairman: Charles E. Fuller; Ranking Member: Isaac R. Sherwood) 
 Investigate Contracts and Expenditures Made by the War Department during the War (Select) (Chairman: N/A; Ranking Member: N/A)
 Irrigation of Arid Lands (Chairman: Moses P. Kinkaid; Ranking Member: Edward T. Taylor) 
 Judiciary (Chairman: Andrew J. Volstead; Ranking Member: Robert Y. Thomas Jr.) 
 Labor (Chairman: John M. C. Smith; Ranking Member: James P. Maher)  
 Library (Chairman: Norman J. Gould; Ranking Member: Ben Johnson)  
 Merchant Marine and Fisheries (Chairman: William S. Greene; Ranking Member: Rufus Hardy) 
 Mileage (Chairman: John A. Elston; Ranking Member: James P. Maher) 
 Military Affairs (Chairman: Julius Kahn; Ranking Member: S. Hubert Dent Jr.) 
 Mines and Mining (Chairman: Mahlon M. Garland; Ranking Member: Otis Wingo) 
 Naval Affairs (Chairman: Thomas S. Butler; Ranking Member: Lemuel P. Padgett) 
 Patents (Chairman: John I. Nolan; Ranking Member: Guy E. Campbell) 
 Pensions (Chairman: Sam R. Sells; Ranking Member: James M. Mead) 
 Post Office and Post Roads (Chairman: Halvor Steenerson; Ranking Member: John A. Moon) 
 Printing (Chairman: Edgar R. Kiess; Ranking Member: James V. McClintic)
 Public Buildings and Grounds (Chairman: John W. Langley; Ranking Member: Frank Clark) 
 Public Lands (Chairman: Nicholas J. Sinnott; Ranking Member: Scott Ferris) 
 Railways and Canals (Chairman: Loren E. Wheeler; Ranking Member: Benjamin F. Welty) 
 Reform in the Civil Service (Chairman: Frederick R. Lehlbach; Ranking Member: Hannibal L. Godwin) 
 Revision of Laws (Chairman: Edward C. Little; Ranking Member: John T. Watkins) 
 Rivers and Harbors (Chairman: Charles A. Kennedy; Ranking Member: John H. Small) 
 Roads (Chairman: Thomas B. Dunn; Ranking Member: Edward W. Saunders) 
 Rules (Chairman: Philip P. Campbell; Ranking Member: Edward W. Pou)  
 Standards of Official Conduct
 Territories (Chairman: Charles F. Curry; Ranking Member: John T. Watkins) 
 United States Shipping Board Operations (Select) (Chairman: Joseph Walsh; Ranking Member: N/A)
 War Claims (Chairman: Benjamin K. Focht; Ranking Member: Frank Clark) 
 Water Power (Special) (Chairman: John J. Esch; Ranking Member: Thetus W. Sims) 
 Ways and Means (Chairman: Joseph W. Fordney; Ranking Member: Claude Kitchin) 
 Woman Suffrage (Chairman: James Robert Mann; Ranking Member: John E. Raker) 
 Whole

Joint committees

 Conditions of Indian Tribes (Special)
 Disposition of (Useless) Executive Papers
 High Cost of Living
 The Library (Chairman: Sen. Frank B. Brandegee)
 Pacific Coast Naval Bases
 Postal Salaries
 Postal Service
 Printing (Chairman: Sen. Reed Smoot)
 Reclassification of Salaries
 Reorganization
 Reorganization of the Administrative Branch of the Government
 Three Hundredth Anniversary of the Landing of the Pilgrims 
 To Investigate the System of Shortime Rural Credits

Caucuses
 Democratic (House)
 Democratic (Senate)

Employees

Legislative branch agency directors
 Architect of the Capitol: Elliott Woods
 Librarian of Congress: Herbert Putnam 
 Public Printer of the United States: Cornelius Ford

Senate
 Chaplain: F.J. Prettyman (Methodist), until January 21, 1921.
 John J. Muir (Baptist), from January 21, 1921.
 Secretary: James M. Baker, until May 19, 1919.
 George A. Sanderson, from May 19, 1919.
 Librarian: Edward C. Goodwin
 Sergeant at Arms: Charles P. Higgins, until May 19, 1919.
 David S. Barry, from May 19, 1919.

House of Representatives
 Chaplain: Henry N. Couden (Universalist)
 Clerk: South Trimble, until May 19, 1919
 William T. Page, from May 19, 1919
 Doorkeeper: Bert W. Kennedy
 Clerk at the Speaker's Table: Clarence A. Cannon
 Lehr Fess
 Reading Clerks: Patrick Joseph Haltigan (D) and Alney E. Chaffee (R)
 Postmaster: Frank W. Collier
 Sergeant at Arms: Robert B. Gordon, until May 19, 1919
 Joseph G. Rodgers, from May 19, 1919

See also 
 1918 United States elections (elections leading to this Congress)
 1918 United States Senate elections
 1918 United States House of Representatives elections
 1920 United States elections (elections during this Congress, leading to the next Congress)
 1920 United States presidential election
 1920 United States Senate elections
 1920 United States House of Representatives elections

References